Popeye (Hebrew: פופאי) is a family of air-to-surface missiles developed and in use by Israel, of which several types have been developed for Israeli and export users. A long-range submarine-launched cruise missile variant of the Popeye Turbo has been speculated as being employed in Israel's submarine-based nuclear forces. The United States operated the Popeye under a different designation according to US naming conventions as the AGM-142 Have Nap.

Design
The Popeye is designed for precision attack against large targets from stand off ranges. The standard Popeye and smaller Popeye-Lite are powered by a single-stage solid rocket.  Rafael offered a Popeye Turbo air launched variant featuring a jet engine and folding wings for a UK competition specifying a cruise missile with range of at least  in 1994; publicly exposing a lowest possible maximum range for that variant. An inertial guidance system pilots the missile towards the target; for terminal homing the pilot can control the missile directly via an INS and data link, aiming via either a television or imaging infrared seeker depending on the missile model. It is not necessary for the launching aircraft to direct the missile—control can be passed to another platform while the firing aircraft escapes the area. There are two choices of warhead for the export versions, a  blast/fragmentation or  penetrator.

Air launched variants
 Popeye II or Popeye Lite (also known as Have Lite)— reduced size (shortened to ) and weight version (weight is now ) of the Popeye to give light aircraft such as the F-16I Sufa a precision standoff strike capability.
 Spice: In 2000, Rafael promoted a "Smart Precise Impact Cost Effective" (Spice) add-on "smart bomb" guidance kit for Mk 84 bombs, this system was based on the Popeye seekers.

Popeye Turbo Submarine Launched Cruise Missile 

It is reasonable to assume that the weapon's range has been extended to the point where it can launch against Tehran and even more Iranian cities from a relatively safe location. It can allegedly carry a 200 kiloton nuclear warhead. It is believed that the stretched Popeye Turbo is the primary strategic second strike nuclear deterrent weapon that can be fired from the  secondary torpedo tubes of the Israeli Dolphin-class submarines. It is believed that the SLCM version of the Popeye was developed by Israel after the US Clinton administration refused an Israeli request in 2000 to purchase Tomahawk long range SLCM because of international MTCR proliferation rules. While the standard Popeye is  the Dolphin class submarines have four  torpedo tubes in addition to the six standard  tubes allowing for the possibility that a SLCM Popeye derivative may be a larger diameter.

Overview
The Popeye is compatible with a variety of aircraft from tactical fighters to heavy bombers.

Since their inception, the missiles have gone through a variety of improvement programs designed to increase reliability and reduce costs. These efforts have included changes in the materials and manufacturing processes of the wings, fins and rocket motor, new components in the inertial guidance unit, an upgraded processor, and an improved imaging infrared seeker.

Israel is thought to be using the airframe and avionics to produce a long-range submarine-launched cruise missile with a liquid-fueled jet engine similar to the Popeye Turbo rather than a rocket.

In US use, the Popeye designated as the AGM-142 Have Nap is intended primarily to equip the B-52H, allowing it to attack fixed targets of high value at sufficient range to provide protection from defences. The missile represented the first precision guided munition to be carried by the B-52H.

The London Sunday Times newspaper reported that on 5 July 2013, Israeli Dolphin submarines fired long-range cruise missiles at stores of Russian-made P-800 Oniks anti-ship missiles kept at the Syrian port of Latakia, contradicting an earlier CNN report it had been an air strike. Israel also deploys sub-Harpoon missiles capable of land attack on its Dolphin class submarines.

In the afternoon of 7 December 2014, two formations composed by two Israeli Air Force F-15Is each, fired Popeye missiles against two separate target sites in Syria. Syrian air defense Buk-M2 missile batteries fired two missiles at the incoming attack planes, both were jammed and two Pechora 2M missiles were hastily launched at the four incoming Popeye missiles, shooting one down.

In the early hours of 30 November 2016, Israeli planes launched air-to-surface Popeye missiles from Lebanese airspace at targets at Sabboura, north-east of Damascus.

Deployment

First developed for use by the Israeli Air Force, it has been in service since 1985.

The United States Air Force first bought a batch of 154 missiles in 1989 followed by a second batch of 54 missiles in 1996.

The Royal Australian Air Force has also purchased a number of Popeye missiles in the late 1990s for use by the RAAF's F-111 bombers. The F-111 was taken out of Australian service in 2010.

Currently, the Turkish Air Force's F-4 2020 Terminator aircraft (which were extensively upgraded by IAI) and the TuAF F-16 CCIP are armed with a Turkish License production version of the Popeye.

Israel and Turkey co-production
In May 1997, Israel and Turkey signed an agreement valued in excess of US$500 million for the establishment of a joint-venture between Israel's Rafael and Turkey's Turkish Aerospace Industries for the co-production of Popeye I and Popeye II missiles in Turkey.

Operators

There have been reports that Israel has exported Popeye and its variants to various countries:

 : Royal Australian Air Force
 : 30 for Indian Air Force
 : Israeli Air Force, Israeli Navy
 : Republic of Korea Air Force
 : Turkish Air Force
 : United States Air Force (retired in 2004)

Specifications
 Weight : 
 Length:  
 Diameter: 
 Wingspan: 
 Guidance: Inertial plus imaging infrared or TV
 Engine: Single-stage solid rocket
 Range: 
 Warhead:  blast fragmentation, or  I-800 penetrating

See also

 Delilah (missile)
 BrahMos
 Cirit
 Ra'ad
 Ra'ad-II
 Rocketsan SOM
 Bina
 Ya-Ali
 Ghassed-3
 Zoobin
 Sadid-1
 Jask-2

References
Citations

Bibliography

External links

 Popeye on Rafael's official site
 AGM-142 The RAAF's New Standoff Weapon
 Federation of American Scientist section page on Popeye
 Excerpts from www.jinsa.org

Rafael Advanced Defense Systems
Guided missiles of Israel
Submarine-launched cruise missiles
Lockheed Martin
Military equipment introduced in the 1980s